Suso's Tower is a 2007 Spanish comedy-drama film written and directed by , in his directorial debut feature. It stars Javier Cámara, Gonzalo de Castro, Malena Alterio, and Emilio Gutiérrez Caba. Fernández was nominated for best new director, Caba for best supporting actor and de Castro for best new actor at the 2008 Goya Awards.

Plot 
Cundo emigrated to Argentina to seek a new life. Ten years later he returns home to Asturias, to the funeral of an old friend, Suso. The film chronicles the reunion with family and friends and how Cundo wants to fulfill the ultimate dream of Suso. The film is a tribute to friendship. And above all friendship in an age where it is not so clear why you should remain friends with your childhood friends.

Cast

Production 
The film was produced by Mediapro. José Manuel Tejedor and Javier Tejedor were responsible for the original score whilst Ángel Hernández-Zoido worked as a film editor and Carlos Suárez as a cinematographer.

Release 
The film was presented in the Zabaltegi slate of the San Sebastián International Film Festival in September 2007. Distributed by Warner Bros Pictures International España, it was theatrically released on 9 November 2007.

See also 
 List of Spanish films of 2007

References

External links

La torre de Suso at FilmAffinity

2007 films
2000s Spanish-language films
Spanish comedy-drama films
2007 directorial debut films
2007 comedy-drama films
2000s Spanish films
Films set in Asturias